Black dot may refer to:

 Black dot (disease) of potato, caused by Colletotrichum coccodes
 A term used in rugby union or rugby league (see Glossary of rugby union terms and Glossary of rugby league terms)
 A black dot used to replace profile images in protest on Facebook and WhatsApp, in relation to the 2012 Delhi gang rape case

See also 

 Black spot (disambiguation)

Dot, black